Live by the Bay is a 1986 direct-to-video concert film of American popular music singer-songwriter Jimmy Buffett and the Coral Reefer Band. It was released in 1986 by MCA Entertainment. The 87-minute film was recorded from back to back concerts in Miami, Florida on August 16 and 17, 1985, at Miami Marine Stadium and is the first concert video released by Buffett. Miami Vice star Don Johnson introduced Buffett to the crowd. A brief rain shower during the middle of the Friday night show prompted Buffett to retreat to his sailboat (docked by the stage) and caused a majority of the final video release to feature the Saturday night show. After the rain cleared on Friday, the band played Little Feat's "Dixie Chicken" to demonstrate the equipment still functioned before Buffett returned to the stage.

The stadium was originally built for powerboat racing. It used a floating stage in front of the grandstand that allowed additional concertgoers to listen from their boats in the water behind the stage, as seen in video. The video introduction includes extended footage of "parrothead" fans on boats and in the water with "Gypsies in the Palace" playing in the background. Buffett returned to Miami Marine Stadium in 1987 for a concert with the Desperadoes Steel Orchestra, but the stadium was ultimately was condemned after Hurricane Andrew in 1992 and remains an abandoned hulk . In 2009, Buffett recorded a short video supporting efforts to restore the stadium.

Released on March 1, 1986, Live by the Bay was directed by Jack Cole, produced by Tammara Wells, and recorded and mixed by Elliot Scheiner. The film was released on VHS and LaserDisc. , the video is out of print and has not been released on DVD. It was occasionally shown on television by the now-defunct VH1 Classic cable network as part of its Classic in Concert series.

At the time, reviewers called the concert video "an amiable mix of folk, rock, country and calypso that conjures up images of good times and tropical breezes" played before "thousands of fans, most of whom seem to have had one too many".

Track list

Following are the tracks on the video:
Introduction / "Gypsies in the Palace"
"Door Number Three"
"Grapefruit-Juicy Fruit"
"We Are the People Our Parents Warned Us About"
"Stars on the Water"
"Coconut Telegraph"
"Come Monday"
"Ragtop Day"
"Who's the Blonde Stranger"
"Volcano"
"Changes in Latitudes, Changes in Attitudes"
Intermission / Interview
"One Particular Harbour"
"If The Phone Doesn't Ring, It's Me"
"Why Don't We Get Drunk and Screw"
"Cheeseburger in Paradise"
"Fins"
"Last Mango in Paris"
"A Pirate Looks at Forty"
"Margaritaville"
End titles / "Son of a Son of a Sailor"

Actual set list
There were several songs deleted from the film.

The Great Filling Station Holdup*
Son of a Son of a Sailor**
Door Number Three
Grapefruit—Juicy Fruit
Pencil Thin Mustache*
We Are the People our Parents Warned us About  Main Set
Stars on the Water
Coconut Telegraph
Come Monday
Ragtop Day
Who's the Blonde Stranger?
Volcano
Changes in Latitudes, Changes in Attitudes  Intermission
One Particular Harbour
If the Phone Doesn't Ring, It's Me
Why Don't We Get Drunk
Let it Ride (Josh Leo)*
Dixie Chicken (Josh Leo)*
I Can't Tell You Why (Timothy B. Schmit)*
Medley:*
Nautical Wheelers*
Tin Cup Chalice*
Boat Drinks*
Banana Republics*
The Captain and the Kid*
Somewhere Over China*
He Went to Paris*
Cowboy in the Jungle*
Cheeseburger in Paradise
Fins
Last Mango in Paris
A Pirate looks at Forty
Margaritaville  Encore
Gypsies in the Palace**
Brown Eyed Girl*

* = Not included on Live By the Bay
** = Abridged version appeared on Live By the Bay, not included on the track list and out of order

References

External links
Video information at BuffettWorld.com
Live by the Bay at Youtube.com

Jimmy Buffett video albums
1986 films
Concert films
1986 video albums
Jimmy Buffett live albums
Live video albums
1980s English-language films